Durlstotherium is an extinct genus of mammal from the Early Cretaceous. It contains a single species, Durlstotherium newmani. The type specimen was found in Durlston Bay, Dorset, after which the genus was named. D. newmani was named after a British pub landlord, Charlie Newman. Durlstotherium and two of its contemporaries, Tribactonodon and Durlstodon, had tribosphenidan (three-cusped) molars, which are an advanced characteristic among eutherian mammals and suggest that the group emerged earlier than the Early Cretaceous.

References

Prehistoric eutherians
Fossil taxa described in 2017
Berriasian genera
Early Cretaceous mammals of Europe
Prehistoric mammal genera